The 2019 IFMA World Muaythai Championships is the 18th edition of the IFMA World Muaythai Championships. The competition are held from July 18 to July 28, 2019, in Bangkok, Thailand. The event served as a qualifier for the 2021 World Games in Birmingham, United States, with each men's and women's team that made the quarter-finals earning points for the qualification.

Russia was initially awarded rights to host this edition, but Thailand negotiated to host this edition instead due to celebrating Coronation of King Vajiralongkorn of Thailand. It was the first world championships after International Olympic Committee (IOC) fully recognized International Federation of Muaythai Amateur (IFMA) in the Association of IOC Recognised International Sports Federations (ARISF) in February 2019.

Schedule
All times are local (UTC+7).

Medal tables

Overall

Elite A

Competitive Class U23

Elite A

Men's events

Women's events

Competitive Class U23

Men's events

Women's events

Royal team trophies
The first place of team ranking will hold a trophy donated by King Vajiralongkorn of Thailand.

Men

Women

Participating nations
A total of 600 athletes from 87 nations and two IFMA team competed.

 (13)
 (12)
 (1)
 (2)
 (14)
 (3)
 (1)
 (15)
 (2)
 (1)
 (5)
 (2)
 (10)
 (7)
 (6)
 (8)
 (6)
 (3)
 (7)
 (1)
 (1)
 (2)
 (9)
 (13)
 (1)
 (7)
 (9)
 (1)
 (7)
 (4)
 IFMA India Invited Team (2)
 IFMA Pakistan Invited Team (9)
 (12)
 (11)
 (6)
 (9)
 (8)
 (10)
 (1)
 (1)
 (4)
 (13)
 (1)
 (5) 
 (2)
 (9)
 (3) 
 (2)
 (7)
 (2)
 (9)
 (1)
 (1)
 (9)
 (5)
 (2)
 (5)
 (2)
 (1)
 (1)
 (8)
 (8)
 (15)
 (9)
 (8)
 (33)
 (2)
 (7)
 (5)
 (3)
 (5)
 (1)
 (6)
 (2)
 (19)
 (1)
 (2)
 (30) (host)
 (1)
 (24)
 (5)
 (24)
 (11)
 (4)
 (11) 
 (1)
 (12)
 (17)
 (1)

References

External links
Official website
WC2019 Event Guidebook

2019
World Championships
Muaythai Championships, World
World Championships
Muaythai Championships, World
Muaythai Championships, World
Muaythai Championships, World